The 2013 Mikhail Voronin Cup took place on December 2–4 in Moscow, Russia.

Medal winners

External links
  Official site

2013
2013 in gymnastics
2013 in Russian sport
Sports competitions in Moscow
2013 in Moscow
December 2013 sports events in Russia